Stanley Unwin (7 June 1911 – 12 January 2002), sometimes billed as Professor Stanley Unwin, was a British comic actor and writer.

He invented his own comic language, "Unwinese", referred to in the film Carry On Regardless (1961) as "gobbledygook". Unwinese was a corrupted form of English in which many of the words were altered in playful and humorous ways, as in its description of Elvis Presley and his contemporaries as being "wasp-waist and swivel-hippy". Unwin claimed that the inspiration came from his mother, who once told him that on the way home she had "falolloped (fallen) over" and "grazed her kneeclabbers".

Early life
Unwin's parents, Ivan Oswald Unwin (1880-1914) and his wife Jessie Elizabeth ( Brand; 1883-1968) emigrated from England to the Union of South Africa in the early 1900s. Their son was born in Pretoria in 1911. Following his father's death in 1914, due to the family's poverty Unwin's mother arranged for the family to return to England. She worked as a cook at Bow Road police station. By 1919, Unwin had been sent to the National Children's Home in Congleton, Cheshire. In the late 1920s, he studied radio, television and languages at Regent Street Polytechnic in London.

In 1937, he married Frances, with whom he had two daughters and a son. Unwin later stated that Unwinese had its roots in enlivening the bedtime stories that he used to tell his children. In 1940, he was given a job in transmitter maintenance for the BBC, and was assigned to the Borough Hill transmitting station in Daventry. Unwin, Frances and their nine-month-old daughter, Marion, moved to Long Buckby in Northamptonshire, where Unwin would reside for the rest of his life.

Comedy career
Unwin's early career and training introduced him to wireless and radio communication, and this, coupled with work in the BBC's War Reporting Unit from about 1944, ultimately proved to be his passage into the media.

While based in Birmingham from 1947 to 1951, Unwin made his first, accidental, transmission. While testing equipment, he handed the microphone to broadcaster F.R. "Buck" Buckley, who ad-libbed a spoof commentary about an imaginary sport called "Fasche". Buckley then encouraged Unwin to join in and introduced him as "Codlington Corthusite", handing back the microphonewhereupon Unwin continued in Unwinese. The recording was played back to two BBC producers, who added sound effects; it was eventually broadcast on Pat Dixon's Mirror of the Month programme and, after receiving a positive response, culminated in another sketch in which Unwin, playing a man from Atlantis, was interviewed about life in the sunken city. The broadcast produced Unwin's first fan mail, from Joyce Grenfell, who had been impressed by his performance. Since Grenfell was Unwin's heroine, the encouragement gave Unwin a boost and he was inspired to break into show business.

After the war, while in Egypt and recording a series of shows by Frankie Howerd, Unwin was pushed onto the stage and told to "do a turn" after the actor suddenly fell ill. Unwin's next major breakthrough came when producer Roy Speer introduced him to the comedian Ted Ray. Once Ray had heard Unwin talking, he said simply: "I want him in the series"namely, The Spice of Life, co-starring June Whitfield and Kenneth Connor. During the mid-1950s, Unwin performed in about a dozen shows for Speer and made the acquaintance of Johnnie Riscoe and his daughter, Patsy, who would become his managers for the rest of his career. By the end of the 1950s, Unwin had ventured into the film industry, being given a part in the Cardew Robinson film Fun at St. Fanny's (1956).

In 1968, Unwin was invited to narrate "Happiness Stan", a six song fairy tale about a boy of the same name, taking up the entire side two of the Small Faces' album Ogdens' Nut Gone Flake, which reached number 1 in the UK Albums Chart.

In 1969, Unwin appeared in Gerry Anderson's "Supermarionation" TV series The Secret Service, both in person and as the voice of the puppet character Father Stanley Unwin, whose appearance was based on him. Episodes typically comprised one or more scenes in which the character of Unwin would attempt to baffle opponents with his gobbledegook. When Lew Grade, Anderson's financial backer and head of distributor ITC, was introduced to the Unwinese dialogue, he cancelled the production on the basis that he believed viewers would not understand what Unwin was saying, despite the fact that such confusion was intentional.

Though professionally retired in his later decades, Unwin still continued to make occasional appearances. In the 1970s, he appeared on The Max Bygraves Show on ITV, sometimes speaking normally and sometimes in gobbledegook. In the final episode, Bygraves tested a number of gobbledegook phrases on Unwin, who claimed that he could not understand them.  In 1985, Unwin recorded with Suns of Arqa on their album Ark of the Arqans, providing spoken word accompaniment in Unwinese on the first three tracks.  In 1987, he recorded again with Suns of Arqa on their track "Erasmus Meets The Earthling", featured on their album Seven, and a remixed version of this track was released again in the 1990s.  He appeared as himself in a hospital scene of Inside Victor Lewis-Smith. In 1994, Unwin collaborated with British dance music act Wubble-U on their single "Petal"; on its re-release in 1998, the track ranked number 55 in the UK Chart. In 1998, Unwin made a cameo appearance in the Aardman Animations series Rex the Runt, as an accountant who speaks largely in fairly standard English, occasionally lapsing inexplicably into Unwinese.

Unwinese
Unwinese, also known as "Basic Engly Twenty Fido", was an ornamented and mangled form of English in which many of the words were deliberately corrupted in a playful and humorous manner, but which was still largely comprehensible to the listener. Unwin's performances could be hilarious yet disorientating, where the meaning and context were conveyed in a disguised and picturesque style. For example, in his talk on music, "Populode of the Musicolly", Unwin says:

Unwinese has been compared to Lewis Carroll's nonsense poetry, such as Jabberwocky, where the sentences sound superficially like English when read aloud, but their precise meaning is unclear.

Selected works

Fun at St. Fanny's (1955, film) as The Guide
Beyond Our Ken (1958, radio, cameo)
Rotatey Diskers with Unwin (1960, LP of Unwinese)
The Miscillian Manuscript (1961, travel journal in Unwinese, illustrated by Roy Dewar)
Inn for Trouble (1960, film) as Farmer
Carry On Regardless (1961, film) as Landlord
House & Garbidge (1962, book spoofing home and lifestyle magazines, with Dewar)
 India Autoways Advertisement (t.v./cinema) (1966) (car tyre manufacturer) with Raymond Baxter
Rock-a-Bye Babel and Two Fairly Tales (1966, book of spoof nursery rhymes and fairy tales, with Dewar)
Press for Time (1966, film) as Mr. Nottage (Town Clerk)
Ogdens' Nut Gone Flake (Small Faces album, 1968, as Narrator of Side 2)
Chitty Chitty Bang Bang (1968, film) as Chancellor of Vulgaria
The Secret Service (1969, TV series) as Father Stanley Unwin
Pirelli Tyres TV advertisement (1980, featuring slogan "Outstandifold in the wetty grippers")
The Laughing Prisoner (The Tube TV Special) (1987, TV, The Prisoner parody)
Just a Minute (1987, 1989; radio)
Shaun the Sheep Movie (2015, archive footage)

Death and legacy

Unwin died at Danetre Hospital in Daventry on 12 January 2002. He is buried in the churchyard at Long Buckby, with Frances, who predeceased him in 1993. Their gravestone bears the epitaph, "Reunitey in the heavenly-bodeDeep Joy!".

A thanksgiving service was held at St Lawrence's Church in Long Buckby and ended with a rendering of "Bye Bye Blackbird" by John Percival and friends. The valediction had been prepared by Unwin's family in his own style: "Goodly Byelode loyal peeploders! Now all gatherymost to amuse it and have a tilty elbow or a nice cuffle-oteedeeOh Yes!"

Suns of Arqa released a tribute album to Unwin (entitled "Tributey") following his death, featuring a selection of his works with the band over the years, as well as various interviews.

Unwin's work is considered to have been a significant influence on the two books written by John Lennon: In His Own Write (1964) and A Spaniard in the Works (1965).

References

Sources

External links

 
 
 Obituary in The Guardian
 Video clip of Stanley Unwin on Parkinson
 

1911 births
2002 deaths
20th-century British male actors
20th-century British writers
Alumni of the Regent Street Polytechnic
BBC people
Deaths in the United Kingdom
British comedy writers
British male comedians
British male film actors
British male radio actors
British male stage actors
British male television actors
British male voice actors
People from Pretoria
People from Congleton
Constructed language creators
People from Long Buckby
20th-century British comedians
Suns of Arqa members